Princetonia (minor planet designation: 508 Princetonia) is an asteroid, a minor planet orbiting the Sun. It was discovered by Raymond Smith Dugan at Heidelberg, Germany in 1903 and named "Princetonia" for Princeton University in New Jersey in the United States.

Dugan found it during his time at Königstuhl Observatory with Max Wolf in Heidelberg, Germany. At the time he was working on his PhD from Heidelberg University.

See also 
 List of Solar System objects by size

References

Further reading

External links
 
 

Background asteroids
Princetonia
Princetonia
Princeton University
C-type asteroids (Tholen)
19030420